Tajik League is the top division of the Tajikistan Football Federation, it was created in 1992.  These are the statistics of the Tajik League in the 2002 season.

Table

Top scorers

External links
 

Tajikistan Higher League seasons
1
Tajik
Tajik